Roblin Airport  is located adjacent to Roblin, Manitoba, Canada.

References

Registered aerodromes in Manitoba